The mixed team recurve competition at the 2011 World Archery Championships took place on 4–10 July 2011 in Torino, Italy. 56 teams of two archers competed in the qualification round on 4–5 July; the top 16 teams qualified for the knockout tournament on 6 July, with the semi-finals and finals on 10 July. The tournament doubled as the principal qualification tournament for the 2012 Olympics.

Top seeds Im Dong-hyun and Ki Bo-bae won the competition for Korea, defeating Mexico in the final.

Seeds
Seedings were based on the combined total of the team members' qualification scores in the individual ranking rounds. The top 16 teams were assigned places in the draw depending on their overall ranking.

Draw

References

2011 World Archery Championships